WTBC (1230 AM) is a radio station broadcasting a classic country format. Licensed to Tuscaloosa, Alabama, United States, the station serves the greater Tuscaloosa area.  The station is owned by Townsquare Media and features programming from Local Radio Networks. It was also the first media position that James Spann ever had in the media.

In May 2016, it was announced that Townsquare Media would be buying the WTBC and sister station WNPT-FM (now WTID) for $550,000. (Alabama Broadcast Media Page) According to published reports, WNPT-FM will go sports and WTBC will retain the Catfish Country format, once the new owners take over. Townsquare Media's purchase of the stations was consummated on July 15, 2016.

As of this update, Catfish Country is now being heard exclusively on WTBC and translator W261BT, branded as Catfish 100.1.

Under the ownership of Townsquare Media, WTBC provides regular weather coverage from WVUA (TV) in Tuscaloosa, under the direction of their Chief Meteorologist Richard Scott.

During times of active severe, tropical, and Winter weather events, WTBC provides West Alabama's only live and local weather coverage on the radio, with local, in house, Staff Meteorologist Bobby Best.

Additionally, under the ownership of Townsquare Media and the direction of Market President/Chief Revenue Officer David R. Dubose, WTBC also provides West Alabama radio's only live and local news coverage with News Director Don Hartley and West, Alabama's only live and local traffic coverage with Traffic Reporter Capt'n Ray.

Translator

References

External links

TBC
Townsquare Media radio stations
Radio stations established in 1946
1946 establishments in Alabama